Acrobasis legatea is a species of snout moth in the genus Acrobasis. It was described by Adrian Hardy Haworth in 1811. It is found in most of Europe, except the north, east to Russia and Kazakhstan.

The wingspan is 19–25 mm. Adults are on wing from mid-June to the beginning of September in one generation per year.

The larvae feed on Rhamnus catharticus and Frangula alnus.

References

Moths described in 1811
Acrobasis
Moths of Europe
Moths of Asia